John Hartigan  (born 16 November 1947) is a former Australian journalist and media executive, who worked for News Ltd for 41 years, ending his career there as CEO and chair in 2011.

Career
Hartigan started his career in newspapers at the age of 16 and worked for John Fairfax and Sons from 1964 to 1970.

After joining News Ltd in 1970 as a reporter on The Daily Mirror in 1970, he later worked for The Daily Telegraph, both in Sydney. He then moved to London worked for The Sun, and on to New York City to report for the New York Post.

Upon his return to Australia, Hartigan moved to Brisbane to take up editorship of the Queensland edition of the Sunday Herald Sun, and became inaugural editor of The Daily Sun there. He was also  director of News Ltd subsidiary Queensland Sun Newspapers.

In 1986 Hartigan took up editorship of The Daily Telegraph, being promoted to Editor-in-Chief of  both The Daily Telegraph and The Sunday Telegraph in 1989. In 1997 he was appointed to the most senior editorial position in News Ltd, Group Editorial Director, and was responsible for all of the company's newspapers in that role.

In 2000 he was appointed Chief Executive Officer, adding chairman to his role in 2005. During his time in the roles, he presided over a number of controversies, included Eatock v Bolt, the court case following News Ltd journalist Andrew Bolt breaching the Racial Discrimination Act, and an unfair dismissal case brought by former Herald Sun editor Bruce Guthrie.

On 30 November 2011, Hartigan left News Ltd, and owner Rupert Murdoch took on the role of chairman, while former Foxtel executive Kim Williams took on the role of CEO. Staff were shocked at the decision and there was speculation as to whether he left of his own accord or not.

Other activities
2006: Australian National University's Reconciliation Lecture, addressing ways to reduce Indigenous Australians' disadvantage
2007: Andrew Olle Media Lecture at the Australian Broadcasting Corporation
2007: Leader of "Australia’s Right to Know", a media coalition which advocated for legislative changes "to improve the openness and transparency of government and the courts"

 he was director of The Bradman Foundation, the American Australian Association, the NSW Wine Industry Council and the NSW Export and Investment Advisory Board.

Awards and recognition
2008: Walkley Award for Journalistic Leadership
2020: Kennedy Awards, Lifetime Achievement Award
2022: Officer of the Order of Australia, in the Australia Day Honours

Personal life
Hartigan was married to journalist Rebecca Wilson, who died of breast cancer in October 2016. They had honeymooned on the Greek island of Santorini just weeks before her diagnosis in 2012, and had been partners for at least two years before that.

Footnotes

References 
 

Living people
1947 births
20th-century Australian journalists
21st-century Australian people
Australian media executives
Officers of the Order of Australia